Vicente Agustín Sota Barros (24 April 1924 – 16 August 2017)  was a Chilean politician. He served two stints in the Chamber of Deputies, first from 1965 to 1969 and again from 1990 to 1998.

Career
Born in Talca on  28 April 1924, he earned a degree in industrial engineering from Pontifical Catholic University of Chile. Sota joined the National Falange in 1940, and upon the party's dissolution in 1957, became a member of the  Christian Democratic Party. While affiliated with the PDC, Sota served in the Chamber of Deputies as a representative of central Santiago between 1965 and 1969. Shortly after the end of his first term in office, Sota cofounded the Popular Unitary Action Movement. Sota left Chile for France after the 1973 Chilean coup d'état, where he spent thirteen years until returning to Chile in March 1986. The next year, Sota co-founded the Party for Democracy. He won two more parliamentary elections after joining the PPD, in 1989 and 1993, representing district 31, which covered portions of Santiago from 1990 to 1998. Between November 1994 and March 1995, Sota served as President of the Chamber of Deputies of Chile.

References

1924 births
2017 deaths
Members of the Chamber of Deputies of Chile
Presidents of the Chamber of Deputies of Chile
Christian Democratic Party (Chile) politicians
Popular Unitary Action Movement politicians
Party for Democracy (Chile) politicians
20th-century Chilean engineers
Industrial engineers
People from Talca
Pontifical Catholic University of Chile alumni
Chilean exiles
Chilean expatriates in France